Angry Salad is the third album released by the band Angry Salad. It was released in 1999 by Blackbird Records, a division of Atlantic Records. and is the name of their demo album.

Track listing
 "The Milkshake Song" (3:46)
 "How Does It Feel To Kill?" (3:59)
 "Rico" (4:24)
 "Stretch Armstrong" (3:35)
 "99 Red Balloons" (2:55)
 "Saturday Girl" (4:24)
 "Empty Radio" (4:33)
 "Scared Of Highways" (3:39)
 "Coming To Grips" (3:45)
 "Red Cloud" (6:04)

Personnel
 Bob Whelan: Guitar and Vocals
 Alex Grossi: Guitar
 Brian Vesco: Bass
 Hale Pulsifer: Drums

1999 albums
Angry Salad albums